Lê Long Đĩnh (黎龍鋌, 15 November 986 – 19 November 1009), also known as Lê Ngọa Triều (黎臥朝), was the last emperor of the Early Lê family of the kingdom of Đại Cồ Việt, ruling from 1005 to 1009. After killing his predecessor and brother Lê Long Việt, he took the throne and named his era Cảnh Thụy. His mysterious death at the age of 24 led to the fall of the Anterior Lê dynasty, then all of power was seized by House of Lý. In some history books, he was portraited as a debauched, cruel emperor. However, a lot of temples were created where people still worship him, and recently, some historians have proved that some rumours about his ruling style were aggrandisements, even seen as fabrications.

Background
Lê Long Đĩnh, who was also named Lê Chí Trung (黎至忠), was born on 15 November 986 by the Western calendar. He was the fifth son of Emperor Lê Hoàn, but later historians do not note any background of his mother, only information regarding a concubine. He was the half-brother of the Duke of Nam Phong (Nam Phong vương) Lê Long Việt.

The Đại Việt sử ký toàn thư recorded that in 992 he was granted the title Prince of Khai Minh (Khai Minh Vương, 開明王) and ruled over Đằng county (now Hưng Yên province). In 1004 the crown prince and duke of Kinh Thiên Lê Long Khâu died; the emperor made Lê Long Việt the crown prince of Việt Nam and Long Đĩnh the Duke of Khai Minh.

Struggle for the throne
In 1005, Lê Đại Hành died in Trường Xuân palace. Crown prince Lê Long Việt contested the crown with his other three brothers: Lê Long Tích,  Lê Long Kính, and Lê Long Đĩnh. The three princes pitted their armies against each other, plunging Vietnam into civil war. In October 1005, Lê Long Việt defeated Lê Long Tích, forcing him to flee to Champa. He was subsequently killed by locals at the Cơ La estuary. The victorious Lê Long Việt was proclaimed as emperor with the title Trung Tông hoàng đế (Emperor Trung Tông). 

Three days after his ascension, however, Trung Tông was murdered by asssassins in Lê Long Đĩnh's employ. All of his supporters fled, except for Lý Công Uẩn who embraced the body of the emperor and wept. In winter of 1005, Lê Long Đĩnh took the throne with the reigning name Khai Thiên Ứng Vận Thánh Văn Thần Vũ Tắc Thiên Sùng Đạo Đại Thắng Minh Quang Hiếu Hoàng đế (開天應運聖文神武則天崇道大勝明光孝皇帝) and gave the title Hưng Quốc Quảng Thánh Hoàng Thái Hậu (興國廣聖皇太后) to his mother.

Career

Foreign relations
After news of the death of Emperor Lê Đại Hành in China, Song dynasty mandarins urged the Song emperor Taizong to dispatch forces to invade Đại Cồ Việt. However, Taizong chose to respect the tributary status that Đại Cồ Việt had paid with respect to the Song empire, and he left Vietnam alone. Some trading activities were even allowed to occur between the borders of both nations.

Sponsorship of Buddhism and education
In spring 1007, Lê Long Đĩnh ordered his brother to gift a white pangolin (or white rhinoceros) as a gift to the Song dynasty in exchange for Buddhist sutras to be sent to Vietnam. In Vietnamese Buddhism, records of Zen Buddhist Thích Mật Thể, the 14th year of Ứng Thiên era (1008), Vietnam sent the envoy to Song to pay tribute and asked for taking nine classics and sutra to Vietnam. The Song emperor approved the request and gave the requested works to the Vietnamese ambassador. The nine classics included I Ching, Classic of Poetry, Book of Documents, Book of Rites, Spring and Autumn Annals, Classic of Filial Piety, Analects, and Mencius. These were the nine classics of Chinese civilization that first came to Vietnam under the reign of Lê Long Đĩnh.

Dispute

Tyrannical and brutal reign
According to the Complete annals of Đại Việt, Lê Long Đĩnh was one of the most brutal and sadistic rulers during Vietnam's dynastic era. His reign was considered a reign of terror at the time. He is comparable to the Roman emperors Caligula and Commodus in their traits of excess cruelty and paranoia. Some of the acts of cruelty that he committed were:
He often executed innocent people who were condemned to death for entertaining purposes by some frightful ways such as tying them with hay to burn to death or ordering an executioner called Liêu Thủ Tâm (廖守心) from Great Song to gradually mutilate victims to death slowly using dull bladed swords and axes. When the victims cried out in agony, this executioner would manipulate the victims into thinking they were not dying. The emperor was said to have delighted in the deaths of his victims.
 After capturing prisoners of war, he ordered his soldiers to march the prisoners along the riversides and crammed them into cages that were tied along the riverbanks. When the high tides came in at dusk, he would watch them drown slowly.
 The emperor himself often stuck livestock such as pigs or cows to death before he allowed servants to prepare them for feasts. At court banquets, he killed cats and served them to his guests and court officials and made them eat the cats. Afterwards, he would play around with their severed heads in front of the court audience, frightening them and reducing their chances of questioning his audacity.

Later life
According to historical records, he had contracted hemorrhoids and often held court while lying down, earning the popular name "Lê Ngọa Triều" ("Ngọa" means "lie" and "Triều" means "court"). He was not given a temple name because his successor usurped the Anterior Lê dynasty and started the Lý dynasty.

He held the throne for four years, until 1009, when he died at the age of 24. His son Sạ was but a child so under the management of an official named Đào Cam Mộc (陶甘沐).  When Lý Công Uẩn became emperor of the Ly dynasty, all the officials enthroned him without any debate. The Anterior Lê dynasty was finished after only three reigns.

References

986 births
1009 deaths
Early Lê dynasty emperors
Vietnamese monarchs